Fangshan Chengguan station is a station on Yanfang Line of the Beijing Subway. It was opened on 30 December 2017.

Station Layout 
The station has an elevated island platform.

Exits 
There are 4 exits, lettered A1, A2, B1, and B2. Exits A1 and B2 are accessible.

Gallery

References 

Beijing Subway stations in Fangshan District